The following is a list of Qazis (Chief Justices) of the Maldives.

Qazi Mohamed Shamsuddin (d. 1645)
Hussain Quthubuddin (d. 1661)
Hassan Thakurufaan
Mahmood Ranfuthu Fandiyaar (d. 1678)
Mohamed bin Hajj Ali Thukkala
Hassan Thaajuddeen (d. 27 February 1727)
Mohamed Muhibbuddeen (Sheikhul Islam) (d. 1784)
Ibrahim Siraajudeen (d. 1811)
Muhibbuddeen (d. 24 September 1868)
Ibrahim Majududdin (d. 7 May 1870)
Moosa Badruddin (d. 1875)
Ismail Bahauddin (d. 28 August 1889)
Hushaamudeen (in office 1891–1892)
Elhegey Ali Didi Fandiyaaru Manikufan (d. 16 May 1903
Velidhoogey Hussain Didi (d. 11 August 1913
Husain Salahuddini
Uz Moosa Fathuhy
Uz Mohamed Rasheed Ibrahim
Uz Abdulla Saeed
Uz Ahmed Faiz Hussain (Chief Justice)
 Dr Ahmed Abdullah Didi (chief justice)

Judges of the Interim Supreme Court of Maldives
Uz Abdulla Saeed (Interim Chief Justice)
Uz Ahmed Faiz Hussain
Sh Abdullah Areef
Uz Mujuthaz Fahumy
Sh Yoosuf Hussain

Judges Supreme Court of Maldives
 Uz Ahmed Muthasim Adnan (Chief Justice)
 Uza Aisha Shujoon Mohamed 
 Dr. Azmiraldha Zahir 
 Uz Mahaz Ali Zahir
 Uz Husnu Al Suood
 Uz Ali Rasheed Hussain
 Dr. Mohamed Ibrahim

Judges of High Court of Maldives
 Uz Hussein Shaheed (Chief judge)
 Uz Mohamed Niyaz
 Uz Mohamed Faisal
 Uz Hussain Mazeed
 Uza Fathimath Faruheeza
 Uz Hassan Shafeeu
 Uza Huzaifa Mohamed
 Uza Dheebanaz Fahmy
 Uz Mohamed Saleem
 Uz Ahmed Shakeel

Judges of Civil court of Maldives
 Uz Abdullah Ali (Chief Judge)
 Uz Hathif Hilmy 
 Uz Ali Naseer
 Uz Abdulla Jameel Moosa
 Uz Adam Ibrahim Ismail
 Uz Faruhaad Rasheed
 Uz Hassan Faheem Ibrahim
 Uz Zubair Mohamed
 Uz Abdul Nasir Shafeeq
 Uz Mohamed Haleem
 Uz Hussain Mazeed
 Uz Ali Abdulla
 Uz Mariyam Waheed
 Uz Haafiza Abdul Sattar
 Uz Hussein Faiz Rashaad
 Uz Ahmed Rasheed
 Uz Fayyaz Shathir
 Uz Aishath Azfa Abdul Ghafoor
 Uz Rizmeena 
 Uz Ahmed Abdul Matheen

Judges of Family Court of Maldives
 Uz Hassan Saeed (Chief Judge)
 Sh Abdulla Adeeb
 Uz Ahmed Musthafa
 Uz Ibrahim Mahir
 Uz Abdullah Mohamed
 Uz Ahmed Sameer Abdul Azeez
 Uz Ahmed Sameer
 Uz Abdullah Nasheed

Judges of Criminal Court of Maldives
 Uz Ismail Rasheed
 Uz Ali Adam
 Uz Ibrahim Ali
 Uz Hassan Najeeb
 Uz Mohamed Sameer
 Uz Hussain Faiz Rashaad
 Uz Hassan Saeed
 Uz Adam Mohamed

Judges of Juvenile Court of Maldives
 Uz Saeed Ibrahim (Chief Judge)
 Uz Abdul Baaree Yousuf
 Uz Ahmed Shareef

Judges of Drug Court of Maldives
 Uz Abdul Sattar Abdul Hameed (Chief Judge)
 Uz Mohamed Naeem
 Uz Hussain Shahamath Mahir
 Uz Muhuthaz Fahumee
 Uz Adam Arif